Richard Oakeley (died 1653) was an English landowner and politician who sat in the House of Commons in 1624. He supported the Royalist cause in the English Civil War.

In 1624, he was elected Member of Parliament for Bishop's Castle in the Happy Parliament. He was a Royalist  commissioner during the Civil War, and was fined of £460 for his delinquency.
 
Oakeley died in 1653.

Oakeley married Mary Combes, daughter of Edward Combes of Fetter Lane, London. Their son William was also MP for Bishops Castle.

References

Year of birth missing
1653 deaths
English MPs 1624–1625
English landowners
Politicians from Shropshire